Menedemus was one of the generals of Alexander the Great, who was sent in 329 BC against Spitamenes, satrap of Sogdiana, but was surprised and slain, together with 2000 foot-soldiers and 300 horse.

Notes

References
Smith, William (editor); Dictionary of Greek and Roman Biography and Mythology, "Menedemus (1)", Boston, (1867)
 

329 BC deaths
4th-century BC Macedonians
Generals of Alexander the Great
Year of birth unknown